Abu Mansur Muhammad ibn Ahmad al-Mu'tadid, usually known simply by his regnal title al-Qahir bi'llah, was the nineteenth caliph of the Abbasid Caliphate from 932 to 934. He was born 286 AH (899 C.E.) and died 339 AH (950 C.E.).

Early life
Al-Qahir was a son of the 16th Abbasid caliph, al-Mu'tadid, and brother of the 18th Caliph, al-Muqtadir. The mother of al-Qahir was a concubine called Fitnah. (She was the mother of al-Mu'tadid's third son, al-Qahir). His full name was Muhammad ibn Ahmad al-Mu'tadid al-Qahir bi'llah, and his  was Abu Mansur.

Rise to the throne
Al-Qahir came to the throne as part of his brother's conflict with the increasingly powerful commander-in-chief, Mu'nis al-Muzaffar. He was first chosen as Caliph in March 929, when Mu'nis launched a coup and deposed al-Muqtadir. Although al-Muqtadir was restored after a few days, Mu'nis now possessed virtually dictatorial authority over the Abbasid government.

In 932, after another breach with al-Muqtadir, Mu'nis marched on Baghdad. Al-Muqtadir tried to confront him, and was killed in the ensuing battle. However, in the subsequent assembly of dignitaries, Mu'nis' candidacy of al-Muqtadir's son Ahmad (the future al-Radi) was rejected in favour of al-Qahir (31 October 932). He was then 35 years old.

Caliphate
The new caliph had a pronounced "headstrong and vindictive personality", according to Dominique Sourdel, which made itself felt soon after his accession, when he tortured his brother's sons and officials, as well as al-Muqtadir's mother Shaghab, to extract their fortune. He was more energetic than his predecessor and cultivated an image of austerity and puritanism at his court, in deliberate contrast to the extravagantly dissolute life led by al-Muqtadir, but behind the scenes he too indulged in drunkenness.

Trying to counteract the influence of Mu'nis and of the vizier Ibn Muqla, who controlled government, and re-assert the power of his office, al-Qahir resumed contacts with the defeated court faction through Muhammad ibn Yaqut. This alarmed Mu'nis and his supporters, but they were too late. In July 933, al-Qahir struck: the plans of the chamberlain Ibn Yalbaq to depose him were thwarted, and he and Mu'nis were arrested and executed, while Ibn Muqla was forced to flee the capital.

Al-Qahir appointed Muhammad ibn al-Qasim ibn Ubayd Allah as vizier. Al-Qahir embarked on a firmly anti-Shi'a policy, declaring himself the "Avenger of the enemies of the Faith" (al-muntaqim min aʿdāʾ dīn Allāh), a slogan which he even put on his coins. Despite his support of the Caliph's anti-Shi'a policies, Muhammad ibn al-Qasim was soon dismissed in favour of Ahmad al-Khasibi. Like his predecessor, however, al-Khasibi was unable to overcome the mounting financial crisis of the state.

The contemporary Baghdadi historian al-Mas'udi, in his Meadows of Gold, reports that "His fits of violence made him the fear and terror of his subjects". He went about armed with a lance, striking down those who displeased him. However, the very "inconstancy of his behaviour and the horror inspired by his rages" alienated the populace and the court alike, and prepared the ground for his downfall.

Downfall and death
The exiled vizier Ibn Muqla continued plotting against al-Qahir; he won over the caliphal guard, which on 24 April 934 staged a coup and took the Caliph prisoner while the latter was drunk.

Refusing to abdicate in favour of al-Radi, he was blinded and cast into prison. According to al-Mas'udi, al-Radi "kept news of him hidden", so that he vanished from common knowledge. He was not freed until eleven years later, when al-Mustakfi came to the throne and discovered him locked away in a remote room in the palace. He lived the remainder of his life as a beggar, dying in October 950.

References

Sources
 
 
 
 
 
 

899 births
950 deaths
10th-century Abbasid caliphs
10th-century rulers in Africa
10th-century rulers in Asia
Prisoners and detainees of the Abbasid Caliphate
Anti-Shi'ism
Dethroned monarchs
Sons of Abbasid caliphs